Below is a list of chief commissioners of Delhi:

1912-1918: William Malcolm Hailey
1918-1924: Claud Alexander Barron
1924-1926: Evelyn Robins Abbott
1926-1928: Alexander Montague Stow
1928: John Nesbitt Gordon Johnson (acting)
1928-1932: John Perronet Thompson
1932-1937: John Nesbitt Gordon Johnson
1937-1940: Evan Meredith Jenkins
1940-1945: Arthur Vivian Askwith
1945-1947: William Christie

Administrators in British India
Delhi-related lists